Judith Schalansky (born 20 September 1980) is a German writer, book designer and publisher.

Work 
Her book Atlas of Remote Islands won first prize in the Stiftung Buchkunst's The Most Beautiful German Books competition (German: Die schönsten deutschen Bücher) in 2009. In 2012, she won the same prize for The Giraffe’s Neck. Schalansky has degrees in both art history and communication design. Since 2013, she has been the general editor of the Naturkunden series, published by Matthes & Seitz.

Personal life 
Schalansky was born in Greifswald. She lives in Berlin with her partner, actor Bettina Hoppe.

The asteroid 95247 Schalansky was named after her in 2011.

Bibliography

English translations

Awards and honors 

 2007: Silbermedaille des Art Directors Club Deutschland for Fraktur mon Amour
 2007: Type Directors Club's Award for Typographic Excellence for Fraktur mon Amour
 2009: First Prize, Stiftung Buchkunst's "The Most Beautiful German Books" for Atlas der abgelegenen Inseln
 2012: First Prize, Stiftung Buchkunst's "The Most Beautiful German Books" for Der Hals der Giraffe
 2014: Preis der Literaturhäuser
 2014: Mainzer Stadtschreiberin
 2015: Droste-Preis
 2018: Wilhelm Raabe Literature Prize for Verzeichnis einiger Verluste
 2020: 
 2020: Nicolas Born Prize
 2021: Warwick Prize for Women in Translation
 2021: Gutenberg Prize of the City of Leipzig
 2022: Carl-Amery-Literaturpreis

References

External links

1980 births
Living people
German non-fiction writers
German women novelists
German lesbian writers
People from Greifswald